Zgonče is a small settlement on the Rute Plateau in the hills south of Rob in the Municipality of Velike Lašče in central Slovenia. The entire municipality is part of the traditional region of Lower Carniola and is now included in the Central Slovenia Statistical Region.

Church

The local church, built north of the settlement, is dedicated to Saints Primus and Felician and belongs to the Parish of Rob. It is a 14th-century building that was remodeled during the Baroque, but the whole interior of the sanctuary is covered in frescos dating to the second half of the 15th century.

References

External links

Zgonče on Geopedia

Populated places in the Municipality of Velike Lašče